The 2004 Thomas & Uber Cup was held from 7 May to 16 May 2004 in Jakarta, Indonesia. It was the 23rd edition of World Men's Team Badminton Championships, Thomas Cup and 20th edition of World Women's Team Badminton Championships, Uber Cup.

After a 12-year drought China finally lifted their fifth title of Thomas Cup and also won their ninth title of Uber Cup.

Host city selection
Indonesia, Japan, and the United States are the countries to submit a bid for hosting the event. Indonesia was selected as host during IBF council meeting in Birmingham.

Teams
The following nations from 5 continents, shown by region, qualified for the 2004 Thomas & Uber Cup. Of the 16 nations, defending champions of Uber Cup, China, and host nation as well as defending champion of Thomas Cup, Indonesia and its Uber Cup team qualified automatically and did not play the qualification round.

Thomas & Uber Cup
 China
 Denmark
 Germany
 Indonesia
 Japan
 Malaysia
 Korea
 South Africa

Thomas Cup
 England
 Thailand
 New Zealand
 United States

Uber Cup
 Australia
 Canada
 Chinese Taipei
 Netherlands

Thomas Cup

Group stage

Group A

Group B

Group C

Group D

Knockout stage

Final round

Uber Cup

Group stage

Group W

Group X

Group Y

Group Z

Knockout stage

Final round

References

External links 
 Thomas Cup
 Uber Cup

Thomas Uber Cup
Thomas & Uber Cup
T
Badminton tournaments in Indonesia